Shine a Light is a 2008 concert film directed by Martin Scorsese documenting the Rolling Stones' 2006 Beacon Theatre performances during their A Bigger Bang Tour. The film also includes archive footage from the band's career and makes use of digital cinematography  for backstage sequences, the first time Scorsese used the technology in a film. The film takes its title from the song of the same name, featured on the band's 1972 album Exile on Main St. A soundtrack album was released in April 2008 on the Universal label. This is also the last movie by Paramount Classics, as the company merged into its sister company Paramount Vantage after the movie was released.

Production 
Scorsese filmed the Rolling Stones at the Beacon Theatre on October 29 and November 1, 2006, but the performance footage used in the film is all from the second show. The music was recorded, mixed and co-produced by Bob Clearmountain. The audio recording was done on the Silver Truck with David Hewitt. The concert footage is preceded by a brief semi-fictionalized introduction about the preparations for the shows, and is intercut with historical news clips and archival interviews with band members.

The shows, which were added to the tour schedule for the purposes of the film shoot, featured a different set list than was typical of other shows on the tour (see below), and were noted for their star-studded crowds, including former United States President Bill Clinton and his wife, Hillary Clinton, who was then a United States senator, and former President of Poland Aleksander Kwasniewski.

The performances benefitted the Clinton Foundation, a charity founded by Bill Clinton, who gave a short speech at the October 29 performance. The film also shows Jack White, Buddy Guy and Christina Aguilera performing with the Stones.

Prior to the October 29 show, 83-year-old Ahmet Ertegun, a co-founder and executive of Atlantic Records and chairman of the Rock and Roll Hall of Fame and museum, was backstage in a VIP social area, the "Rattlesnake Inn," when he tripped and fell, striking his head on the concrete floor. He was rushed to the hospital, and died on December 14, 2006. The film was dedicated to his memory.

According to keyboardist Chuck Leavell's tour diary, Mick Jagger had been ill with throat problems, forcing a postponement of the Stones scheduled Atlantic City concert and the October 31 Beacon Theatre show was moved to November 1, to allow Jagger to recuperate.

Performances 

Most of the performance footage was culled from the second night of filming. "The first night we had Bill Clinton there," Charlie Watts recalled. "I don't know why the Clinton bit's in the movie… That was a bit dull, because they weren't really rock 'n' roll people. But Mick was on fire. You can tell in the third song when Lisa Fisher, the singer, does a shimmy with him and you see the look on her face. He dances like Fred Astaire, going backwards."

All tracks are by Mick Jagger and Keith Richards, except where noted.
 "Jumpin' Jack Flash"
 "Shattered"
 "She Was Hot"
 "All Down the Line"
 "Loving Cup" – with Jack White
 "As Tears Go By" (Jagger/Richards/Oldham)
 "Some Girls"
 "Just My Imagination" (Norman Whitfield/Barrett Strong)
 "Far Away Eyes"
 "Champagne & Reefer" (Muddy Waters) – with Buddy Guy; Richards can be seen giving his guitar to Guy when the song ends.
 "Tumbling Dice" (followed by band introductions)
 "You Got the Silver"
 "Connection" (incomplete/cut with 1999 interview clips)
 "Sympathy for the Devil"
 "Live with Me" – with Christina Aguilera
 "Start Me Up"
 "Brown Sugar"
 "(I Can't Get No) Satisfaction"
 "Shine a Light" (incomplete; audio only)

Additional acoustic instrumental numbers are also played during the closing credits:
 "Wild Horses"
 "Only Found Out Yesterday" (Richards)

Noting the director's frequent use of Stones music in his films, Jagger joked that Shine a Light may be the only Scorsese film that does not include "Gimme Shelter".

Release

Theaters 
Shine a Light was initially scheduled for release on September 21, 2007, but Paramount Classics postponed it until April 2008. The world premiere was at the 58th Berlin International Film Festival on February 7, 2008. The film was also screened in some IMAX cinemas. The IMAX version of the film was the second IMAX Stones concert film, the first being Live at the Max, released in 1991.

Home media 
From Paramount Home Entertainment, Shine a Light was released on DVD and Blu-ray July 29, 2008.

Bonus features:
 A "featurette" with backstage and rehearsal footage
 "Undercover of the Night"
 "Paint It Black" (mistitled "Black" on some editions)
 "Little T&A" (mistitled "She's my little rock and roll" on some editions)
 "I'm Free" (mistitled "Free to do what I want" on some editions)

Reception

Box office 
Shine a Light grossed $5.5 million in the United States and Canada and $10.7 million in other territories for a worldwide total of $16.2 million, against a production budget of $1 million.

Critical response 
Shine a Light received mostly positive reviews from critics.  On Metacritic, which uses a weighted average,  the film has an average score of 76 out of 100 based on 36 critics, indicating "generally favorable reviews".

References

External links
 
 
 
 
 

2008 films
2008 documentary films
American rock music films
Concert films
Films directed by Martin Scorsese
Rockumentaries
Shangri-La Entertainment films
IMAX films
The Rolling Stones documentary films
2000s English-language films
2000s American films
2000s British films